Fly is an unincorporated community in Jackson Township, Monroe County, in the U.S. state of Ohio.

History
A post office called Fly was established in 1886, and remained in operation until 1995. It is said that the townspeople selected the name Fly on account of its brevity.

References

Unincorporated communities in Monroe County, Ohio
Unincorporated communities in Ohio